Symphyotrichum pratense (formerly Aster pratensis) is a species of flowering plant in the family Asteraceae native to the southeastern United States. Its flowers have rose-purple ray florets and pink then purple disk florets.

Gallery

Citations

References

pratense
Flora of the Southeastern United States
Plants described in 1817
Taxa named by Constantine Samuel Rafinesque